There were three NASCAR national series in 2008:

2008 NASCAR Sprint Cup Series - The top racing series in NASCAR
2008 NASCAR Nationwide Series - The second-tier NASCAR racing series
2008 NASCAR Craftsman Truck Series - The third-tier NASCAR racing series

 
NASCAR seasons